Historypin is a digital, user-generated archive of historical photos, videos, audio recordings and personal recollections. Users are able to use the location and date of their content to "pin" it to Google Maps. Where Google Street View is available, users can overlay historical photographs and compare it with the contemporary location.

This content can be added and explored online.
There were formerly a series of smartphone applications, but these were discontinued as of 2015 latest.

The project was created by the non-profit company Shift (formerly We Are What We Do), as part of their inter-generational work, with funding and support from Google as part of a series of commitments to digital inclusion. The website has over 200,000 assets and recollections "pinned" to the Historypin map around the world, with higher contributions in the UK, USA and Australia. The beta version of the website was launched in June 2010 at the Royal Institute in London by Nick Stanhope, CEO of Shift and the full project was launched at the Museum of the City of New York in July 2011.

Collections
The website features a range of themed collections, some of which commemorate historical events. Previous collections include:

 August 2010: The High Street Collection
 September 2010: The Blitz Collection to commemorate the 70th anniversary of the start of The Blitz.
 October 2010: The First World War Collection
 November 2010: The Second World War Collection to commemorate Remembrance Day.
 December 2010: The Christmas Collection
 January 2011: The Facial Hair Through Time Collection

Contributors
As well as user-generated content, material has been added to the site from museums, local history societies, historical photo archives, newspaper archives and businesses. Contributors include Biggleswade History Society, Bishopsgate Institute, John Lewis Partnership, Mirrorpix, New York Transit Museum, PhillyHistory.org, The Ritz Hotel, Baltimore Museum of Industry and the Science & Society Picture Library and the Albright-Knox Art Gallery.

References

External links
 Historypin
 Historypin Schools' Toolkit
 Historypin FAQ
 Shift

Google Maps
Street view services
Digital photography
Photo archives in the United States
Internet properties established in 2010